Julattenius is a genus of hubbardiid short-tailed whipscorpions, first described by Mark Harvey in 1992.

Species 
, the World Schizomida Catalog accepts the following two species:

 Julattenius cooloola Harvey, 1992 – Australia (Queensland)
 Julattenius lawrencei Harvey, 1992 – Australia (Queensland)

References 

Schizomida genera